Vera Chuvashova (born 7 October 1959) is a Russian former middle-distance runner who competed in the 1500 metres. She set personal bests of 1:58.12 minutes for the 800 metres and 4:05.73 minutes for the 1500 m. She represented Russia at the 1993 World Championships in Athletics.

Chuvashova was twice national champion at the Soviet Indoor Athletics Championships, winning over 800 m in 1986 and in the 1000 metres in 1990. She was runner-up to Derartu Tulu in the 3000 metres at the 1992 IAAF World Cup. She topped the field in the 1500 m at the 1993 European Cup.

International competitions

National titles
Soviet Indoor Athletics Championships
800 m: 1986
1000 m: 1990

References

External links

Living people
1959 births
Russian female middle-distance runners
Soviet female middle-distance runners
World Athletics Championships athletes for Russia